The Mrs. A. W. Gridley House is a Frank Lloyd Wright designed Prairie School home 
in Batavia, Illinois.

History
This  house is on a 2.3 wooded acre lot, set well back from the street.  Gridley 
met Wright through P. D. Hoyt, owner of the P. D. Hoyt House in nearby Geneva. The Gridley house was built in 1906. Wright named the house "Ravine House", because of the sloping wildflower ravine to the south of the house. Gridley had financial problems and only lived in the house a short time. In 1912, the house was sold to Frank Snow, president of Batavia's Challenge Feed Mill and Wind Mill Company. Members of the family lived in the house until 1981. The property has been well maintained and any alterations have been well designed in keeping with the original integrity of the house. On February 3, 1993, the house was recognized by the National Park Service with a listing on the National Register of Historic Places.

Architecture
With a low-pitch hip roof, projecting eaves, uninterrupted cedar trim and casement windows, the fourteen room stucco and cypress house is an excellent example of Wright's Prairie School style. The house features include three Roman brick fireplaces, elegant woodwork & built-ins. Wright's original plan for the property also included a barn in a similar style to the house that was never executed (likely due to the advent of the automobile and the owners's then dwindling finances). The Gridley house is in a cruciform plan, common for Wright's early Prairie School houses. Unlike many of Wright's other residential commissions of this scale which were built of brick or plastered cement block, the Gridley house is a framed wood structure with a lathed batten exterior covered with earth-toned tinted stucco, and exterior door, window frames and trim of light stained cedar. The house originally had a cedar shake roof; which has long since been replaced with asphalt shingles. The only substantial external modification to Wrights original facade plan can be seen on the east side facing Batavia Avenue aka Route 31, where a twenty-foot opening was cut through the low stuccoed masonry parapet wall which had previously completely enclosed the contiguous terrace, directly in front of the floor to ceiling glass terrace doors opening into the living room, and replaced with wide & shallow stone steps down to the front lawns, and flanked by matching pilastered plinths which support a pair of reproduction Wright designed planter bowls. This was to done to take advantage of the scenic vista to the east, where the property gently slopes down to the Fox river, which was previously only viewable from the upper storey windows. This alteration was well executed and is completely in keeping with the original style of the house. It would most certainly have met with the architect's approval as it's copied directly from his original plans for the very same terrace entablature along the street front of the recently restored Darwin Martin House in Buffalo, New York (albeit somewhat lower in height and rendered in brick instead of stucco), designed by Wright in the same Prairie Style, a mere three years prior to this commission.
Note: The planter bowls now featured on the modified terrace format here are also copied from the original Martin house design where they top the plinths flanking the steps in the same configuration now installed at the Gridley House. They are basically a shallow round bow topped with a thick squared off lip cast in medusa cement and specifically designed by Wright to be filled with soil to cultivate summer annuals. However, in his original renderings of them, he refers to these as"flower vases"They can be seen in the decorating the exteriors many of his projects (either by his original plan, or added later by owners or restorers as was done here) These planters have been reproduced commercially for several years, but are oddly catalogued by the manufacturer as the "Robie House vase" (?) despite the fact that the Martin House (where they were part of the original design) predates the Robie House commission by several years.

Interior
White oak hardwood floors are used throughout the house. The walls and doors on the second story are pine, as are the floors of the servant's quarters. The floors of the kitchen and butler's pantry are maple, though they have pine doors. The interior plan is dominated with a large front hall running north to south. The east section was the living room, decorated with a Roman brick fireplace, glass terrace doors, side windows, and built-in oak bookcases. Doorways on either side of the fireplace lead to the dining room and hall. The north end of the building is a study room and the south end is a dining room. The study includes another Roman brick fireplace and has a built-in gun and trophy case. The dining room includes a built-in oak buffet with leaded glass lights. Glass doors on the south lead to a covered porch with half walls. The butler's pantry is in the corner of the dining room with built-in cabinets and a copper sink. A narrow hall used as a coat room is found between the dining room and staircase. The oak staircase sits at the center of the house and is ornamented with oak moldings. The west wing of the house was the servants' work and living quarters. A small  addition was completed in 1992. Against the west wall is a small, simple sitting room for the servants. This room also allowed convenient access for servants to the main rooms of the house.

The staircase leads to an upper landing, where three more steps in the reverse direction lead to the main upper hall. The landing includes a door that leads to the servant's staircase, which connects to the sitting room. This staircase also leads to a second-floor sleeping room for servants. The hall is split with a half-wall created by the stairway balustrades and handrail. There are five bedrooms on the upper level. The north bedroom includes a Roman brick fireplace and a walk-in closet. Plumbing throughout the house was replaced, first in the 1930s and then again in 1992.

References

 Storrer, William Allin. The Frank Lloyd Wright Companion. University Of Chicago Press, 2006,  (S.121)

External links

 Interior photos at Huffington Post

Frank Lloyd Wright buildings
Houses on the National Register of Historic Places in Illinois
Buildings and structures in Batavia, Illinois
National Register of Historic Places in Kane County, Illinois
Houses in Kane County, Illinois
Houses completed in 1906
1906 establishments in Illinois